"I Need You" is a single by Marc Anthony that appears also on his album Mended. It was released as a double A-side alongside "Me Haces Falta".

"I Need You" was written by Cory Rooney. The single was released on April 6, 2002, as the debut single from the album.

Music video
Music video is built around Marc Anthony chasing his love interest in a car driving and car racing context.  The actress in the video is Ivana Miličević.

Charts
The song reached No. 22 in Sverigetopplistan, the official Swedish Singles Chart. It also appeared in Swiss Singles Chart.

Weekly charts

Year-end charts

References

2002 singles
2002 songs
Marc Anthony songs
Songs written by Cory Rooney
Columbia Records singles